Pied Piper is a 2016 South Korean police procedural-crime drama television series. It replaced Cheese in the Trap and aired on cable network tvN on Mondays and Tuesdays at 23:00 (KST) time slot for 16 episodes from March 7 to April 26, 2016.

Synopsis
Pied Piper focuses on a police negotiation task force that specializes in tense, worst-case scenarios that require highly trained communication. They handle all sorts of cases, from suicide to hostage situations to terrorist attacks, and even war. They do their work with words, not weapons, to neutralize volatile situations before they erupt into full-blown catastrophes.

Joo Sung-chan (Shin Ha-kyun) is a genius lead negotiator of the crisis negotiation police unit. Meanwhile, Yoon Hee-sung (Yoo Jun-sang) is the anchor of TNN Night News channel. Yeo Myung-ha (Jo Yoon-hee) is an inspector of the Crisis Negotiation Team.

Cast

Main
 Shin Ha-kyun as Joo Sung-chan – A genius negotiator in the past, currently an outside advisor of the police Crisis Negotiation Team
 Choi Won-hong as young Joo Sung-chan
 Jo Yoon-hee as Yeo Myung-ha – An inspector, Crisis Negotiation Team member
 Jeon Min-seo as young Yeo Myung-ha
 Yoo Jun-sang as Yoon Hee-sung – The real Pied Piper, an anchor of TNN Night News channel
  as Jung Soo-kyung – A Pied Piper

People around Joo Sung-chan
  as Seo Geon-il – K-Group chairman
 Choi Won-hong as Seo Joon – Seo Geon-il's son
  as Kang Hong-seok – K-Group management director, chairman's brother-in-law
  as Jung Tae-soo – a member of Assembly

People around Yeo Myung-ha
 Jo Jae-yoon as Han Ji-hoon – SWAT team leader
 Lee Jung-eun as Oh Ha-na – police officer of general switchboard 112 
  as Gong Ji-man – Crisis Negotiation Team leader
 Oh Eui-shik as Choi Sung-beom – Sergeant, digital forensic expert
  as Jo Jae-hee – Sergeant, profiler
 Kim Jong-soo as Yang Dong-woo – Seoul district police chief

People around Yoon Hee-sung
  as Yoon Bo-ram – TNN channel social affairs reporter, Yoon Hee-sung's junior

Extended
 Go Yoon as Jung Hyun-ho – brother of the victim who died during the hostage kidnapping in the Philippines
 Kim Ji-eun as Part-timer at the PC room
  as director Lee Joon-kyung
 Park Ji-hwan as Heo Tae-woong – the bank robber
 Kwon Hyuk-joon – attempts suicide on the Han river bridge
  as Kim Jae-gon
 Kwak Dong-yeon as Gong Jung-in – Gong Ji-man's son
  as Noh Kyung-seok – former TNN syndicate president 
 Lee Kan-hee as Moon Ji-hye – a doctor, Oh Jung-hak's friend
  as judge
 Park Hyo-seon
  as Yeon Joon-hee 
  as Goo Dong-man
 Park Shi-in as Jung Chan-gyu
 Shin Cheol-jin as Shin Won-chang
 Ham Sung-min as PC cafe customer	
  as factory magamement director
 
 
 Kim Jung-seok as factory's CEO
 Yang Fan
 Cao Fei Fei as Shanshan
 Lee Won-jong as detective Lee Cheol-yong
 
 Heo Min-young
  as airplane hacker

Special appearances
 Sung Dong-il as Oh Jung-hak – former Crisis Negotiation Team leader
 Kim Min-seo as Lee Joo-eun – Joo Sung-chan's lover
 Lee Moo-saeng as Prosecutor (Ep.6)

Ratings
In this table,  represent the lowest ratings and  represent the highest ratings.

References

External links
 

TVN (South Korean TV channel) television dramas
2016 South Korean television series debuts
2016 South Korean television series endings
Korean-language television shows
South Korean crime television series
South Korean thriller television series
Television series by KeyEast